Hyphessobrycon agulha (also known as the red-tailed flag tetra) is a species of tetra in the family Characidae. As a freshwater fish, it inhabits the basin of the Madeira River in Brazil along with parts of Peru and Bolivia, and it reaches a maximum length of 4.3 centimetres. Though it is mainly found in the wild, it is occasionally kept by fishkeepers and is sometimes confused with the neon tetra. The fish is primarily an insectivore, though it does eat vegetable matter. It is considered to form a group with other species in Hyphessobrycon as they share a dark stripe running lengthwise.

While its name comes from the native name for this species along the Madeira River in Brazil, the fish also occurs in Colombia and Peru.

References

Characidae
Tetras
Freshwater fish of Brazil
Taxa named by Henry Weed Fowler
Fish described in 1913